Matthew James Doran (born 30 March 1976) is an Australian television and film actor. He is perhaps best known for his roles as Damian Roberts in the Australian soap Home and Away from 1991 to 1996, "Mouse" in the 1999 film The Matrix, and "Elan Sleazebaggano" in the 2002 film Star Wars: Episode II – Attack of the Clones.

Early life and education
Doran was born in Sydney. He is the brother of Mark Doran and uncle of JD and Max Doran. He studied acting for two years at the Australian Film and TV Academy and won an award for Best Performance and Most Improved Student before he graduated in 1991.

Career
After graduation Doran landed a lead role in the film, Pirates' Island, and made an appearance on E Street.

Doran played the part of the schoolboy Damian Roberts in the Australian soap, Home and Away, from 1991 to 1996.  He guest starred in G.P., Fallen Angels, Water Rats, Medivac, Murder Call, Farscape and Stingers.

Personal life
Matt is married to Teri McPhillips. They have one son together.

Filmography

References

External links

1976 births
20th-century Australian male actors
21st-century Australian male actors
Australian male film actors
Australian male television actors
Living people
Male actors from Sydney